Stypopodium zonale is a species of thalloid brown alga in the family Dictyotaceae. It is found in shallow waters in the Caribbean Sea and in various other tropical and sub-tropical seas around the world.

Description
It has smooth, broad blades with squared-off ends that grow in a fan shape. The larger the plant, the greater the degree of splitting. Bands of different coloured material  develop parallel to the growing edge including an iridescent green band that appears every few centimetres. This gives the seaweed an attractive zoned appearance. It is attached to rock by a rhizoidal holdfast and often forms dense beds, the leathery but flexible fronds swaying with the movement of the surrounding water.

Distribution and habitat
Stypopodium zonale is found in shallow areas of the sea around the coasts of Africa, the Canary Islands, Madeira, Florida, Bermuda, The Bahamas, the Caribbean Islands, South America, the Galápagos Islands, Pakistan, Sri Lanka, Singapore, Vietnam, Indonesia, New Zealand and Queensland.

Research
A number of secondary metabolites have been isolated from Stypopodium zonale including several unique cyclic terpenes. These metabolites serve a defensive function and reduce grazing by herbivores. In a research study, the seaweed was extracted with dichloromethane and it was found that the extract was mildly antibacterial and was toxic to fish. This means that any fish that tries feeding on the seaweed is unlikely to come back for more. One of the metabolites, stypoldione, has been shown to inhibit cell division in sea urchin eggs and another exhibits cytotoxic activity against human lung and colon carcinoma cells. In another study it was found that some of the metabolites were present across the whole of the seaweed's range but others were found only in localised populations.

References

Dictyotaceae